Sunak is a neighbourhood in the Pasinler District of Erzurum Province in Eastern Turkey.

History 
According to Sevan Nişanyan, there are records of the village dating as far back as the 11th century and the village population consisted of Armenians until early 20th century. It was formerly named "Plur" or "Pulur", an Armenian-language name meaning "ancient ruins".

Economy 
Cattle herding is a source of income in the village. In the early 2010s, a rural development cooperative was founded in the village to encourage the herding of higher-yield cattle and distribute new cattle amongst the village population.

The village is home to the Sunak Fahrettin Aslan Primary School.

References

Villages in Pasinler District